Errum Manzil or Iram Manzil is an expansive palace standing in Hyderabad, Telangana, India. It was built around the year 1870 by Nawab Safdar Jung Musheer-ud-daula Fakhrul Mulk, a nobleman of Hyderabad state. It is located on top of a hillock off the Khairatabad - Panjagutta road.

History
The mansion is located atop a hillock known as Erragadda or "red hill" in the native Telugu language. For this reason, nawab Fakhrul Mulk decided to name the new palace "Iram Manzil" (Persian for 'Paradise Mansion'), because the Persian word 'Iram' meaning 'Paradise' sounds like "Erram," the Telugu word for "red." He also got the building painted a shade of red in order to emphasize the link, and so you had the red-coloured Erra Manzil on top of Erragadda hill. The nawab intended that the mansion be known by two similar-sounding names: 'Iram Manzil' for the Persian-friendly Muslim nobility of the state and 'Erram Manzil' for the local Telugu people. In time, the latter name has prevailed, and "Erra Manzil" is now the official name of the palace.

Irrum Manzil was used for royal banquets and other grand events. Later, the palace was taken over by the Government to be used as a records store-house .  After some years it was again transferred into the hands of Public Works Department. Presently this palace houses offices of the Engineers-in-chief and the Chief Engineers of the Roads and Buildings and Irrigation/ Command Area Development Departments. 

Recently the Government of Telangana said that the heritage structure, Irrum Manzil would be razed to the ground because of its dilapidated state. There is huge effort to save this heritage structure by the locals. This heritage comes under B2 category on the list of archaeological survey of India. Recently, a High Court order made it illegal to demolish the structure.

Architecture 
Built in the Indo-European Baroque style of architecture, during its heyday the palace had over 150 rooms furnished with Louis XVI furniture, nine-hole golf course, polo ground, stable for horses and a dairy farm. The palace was full of stucco and ornamental works. The palace used to overlook the Hussain Sagar, but this view has now been blocked by other buildings.

References

External links
The Hindu feature
A post on Google Earth Community
Errum Manzil to be torn down for proposed Telangana Assembly building? Government of Telangana press release

Heritage structures in Hyderabad, India
Hyderabad State
Palaces in Hyderabad, India